John Colin Scholey (born 28 September 1930) is a former English first-class cricketer who played ten matches for Worcestershire as a wicket-keeper in the early 1950s.

He twice made five dismissals in an innings. The first occasion was against Sussex at Eastbourne in August 1952, when he claimed four catches and a stumping.
The other was in what proved to be his final first-class game, against Lancashire at Worcester in July 1953; on this occasion all five of his victims were caught.

Notes

External links
Statistical summary from CricketArchive
Lists of matches and detailed statistics for John Scholey from CricketArchive

English cricketers
Worcestershire cricketers
1930 births
Living people
Wicket-keepers